National Lampoon's Pucked (also known as Pucked, and National Lampoon's The Trouble with Frank) is a 2006 comedy movie starring Jon Bon Jovi in the main role. This is the last film directed by Arthur Hiller before his death in 2016.

Plot
Frank Hopper (Bon Jovi) is a former lawyer, who receives a credit card in the mail, and believes he's hit the jackpot. It's not long before he's working his way toward financing his dream – an all-woman hockey team. He's also put himself in debt to more than $300,000. He winds up in court when his plan backfires.

Cast
 Jon Bon Jovi as Frank Hopper
 Estella Warren as Jessica
 David Faustino as Carl
 Curtis Armstrong as Janitor
 Nora Dunn as Leona
 Cary Elwes as Norman
 Pat Kilbane as Elvis
 Danielle James as Danielle
 Dana Barron as Tiny1

References

External links
 
 
 

2006 films
2006 comedy films
National Lampoon films
Films directed by Arthur Hiller
Films shot in North Carolina
Films scored by Stewart Copeland
2000s English-language films